Hippopotame was a 50-gun ship of the line of the French Navy, designed by François Coulomb the Younger. She served during the Seven Years' War. In 1777, Pierre Beaumarchais purchased her as part of a commercial entreprise to provide weapons of the American independentist insurgents. She was part of the French line of battle at the Battle of Grenada on 6 July 1779, and served as a hospital during the Siege of Savannah.

Career

Seven Years' War 
Hippopotame entered service in 1750. From 1760, she was under Hippolyte de Sade de Vaudronne.  In 1763, she conducted a mission to Algiers, under Captain de Fabry.

Interwar period 
In 1769, Hippopotame was at Saint Domingue and Martinique under Vaudreuil, along with Solitaire, ferrying troops to the French colonies in the Caribbeans.

She was part of the 1772 Escadre d'évolution under Captain Bougainvilliers de Croy.

War of American Independence 
In April 1777, the Navy sold her to Roderigue Hortalez and Company, a company founded by Pierre Beaumarchais. He renamed her  Fier Rodrigue and from 1778, he used her to ferry weapons to the American insurgents. She departed Rochefort in January 1778, sailed to Saint-Domingue and America, and was back in Rochefort on 1 October. 

In early 1779, she departed Rochefort to sail to Brest and Ile d'Aix. She departed Ile d'Aix around April, and sail to America.

In July 1779, Fier Rodrigue was escorting a 10-ship convoy near Grenada. On 6, she encountered the fleet under d'Estaing, preparing for battle. the French Navy requisitioned her and she took part in the ensuing Battle of Grenada. Her captain, Montault, was killed, and 22-year old auxiliary officer Ganteaume

The requisition of Fier Rodrigue caused several ships of Beaumarchais' convoy to be captured. Beaumarchais protested and sought compensation from the French Crown. 

Around August 1779, Fier Rodrigue was used as a hospital ship in Charlestown, to support the Siege of Savannah. Two month later, the Navy returned her to Beaumarchais. 

Fier Rodrigue called the Chesapeake and Yorktown, from where she departed on 14 August 1780, bound for Rochefort. On 1 August 1780, Fier Rodrigue arrived at Île de Ré, escorting a 15-ship convoy from New England, as well as two prizes captured from the British.

Fate 
Fier Rodrigue was condemned in march1782, and was broken up in Rochefort in 1784.

Notes, citations, and references 
Notes

Citations

Bibliography
  
 
 
 
 
 
 
 
 
 

External links
 

Ships of the line of the French Navy
1749 ships